STS-73 was a Space Shuttle program mission, during October–November 1995, on board the Space Shuttle Columbia. The mission was the second mission for the United States Microgravity Laboratory. The crew, who spent 16 days in space, were broken up into 2 teams, the red team and the blue team. The mission also included several Detailed Test Objectives or DTO's.

Crew

Backup crew

Mission highlights

The second United States Microgravity Laboratory (USML-2) Spacelab mission was the prime payload on STS-73. The 16-day flight continued a cooperative effort of the U.S. government, universities and industry to push back the frontiers of science and technology in "microgravity", the near-weightless environment of space.

On October 26, through pre-recorded video, Mission Commander Ken Bowersox threw out the first pitch for Game 5 of the 1995 World Series between the Cleveland Indians and the Atlanta Braves from orbit. 

Some of the experiments carried on the USML-2 payload were suggested by the results of the first USML mission that flew aboard Columbia in 1992 during STS-50. The USML-1 mission provided new insights into theoretical models of fluid physics, the role of gravity in combustion and flame spreading, and how gravity affects the formation of semiconductor crystals. Data collected from several protein crystals grown on USML-1 enabled scientists to determine the molecular structures of those proteins.

USML-2 built on that foundation. Technical knowledge gained was incorporated into the mission plan to enhance procedures and operations. Where possible, experiment teams refined their hardware to increase scientific understanding of basic physical processes on Earth and in space, as well as to prepare for more advanced operations aboard the International Space Station and other future space programs.

USML-2 Flight controllers and experiment scientists directed science activities from NASA's Spacelab Mission Operations Control facility at the Marshall Space Flight Center. In addition, science teams at several NASA centers and universities monitored and supported operations of a number of experiments.

Other payloads on board included the Orbital Acceleration Research Experiment (OARE), Space Acceleration Measurement System (SAMS), Three Dimensional Microgravity Accelerometer (3DMA), Suppression of Transient Accelerations By Levitation Evaluation (STABLE) and the High-Packed Digital Television Technical Demonstration system.

Some of the crew appeared on the 13 February 1996 episode of Home Improvement, "Fear of Flying", on a segment of Tool Time.

Launch was originally scheduled for 25 September 1995 but endured six scrubbed launch attempts before its 20 October 1995 lift off. STS-73 and STS-61C both carry the distinction of being tied for the most scrubbed launches, each having launched on their seventh attempt.

See also

List of human spaceflights
List of Space Shuttle missions
Outline of space science
Space Shuttle
STS-80 (17-day 8-hour Shuttle mission)
STS-78 (16-day 21-hour Shuttle mission)
STS-67 (16 days 15-hour Shuttle mission)

References

External links
 NASA mission summary 
 STS-73 Video Highlights 

Space Shuttle missions
Spacecraft launched in 1995